Three steam ships have been named Karanja:

 , a paddle steamer built in 1865 and home-ported in Bombay
 , a steamship bombed and sunk off Algeria in 1942
 , passenger steamer that sailed routes in the Indian Ocean

Ship names